Magenta Line may refer to:

 Magenta Line (Delhi Metro), Delhi, India
 Magenta Line (London), the Metropolitan line (the Met) of the London Underground
 Magenta Line (Paris), Paris Metro, France
 Magenta Line (São Paulo Metro), Brazil
 Magenta Line (Shanghai), China

See also
 Magenta (disambiguation)
 Pink Line (disambiguation)
 Purple Line (disambiguation)
 Red Line (disambiguation)